Siro Meli (10 October 1946 – 4 September 2018) was an Italian rower. He competed at the 1972 Summer Olympics and the 1984 Summer Olympics.

References

1946 births
2018 deaths
Italian male rowers
Olympic rowers of Italy
Rowers at the 1972 Summer Olympics
Rowers at the 1984 Summer Olympics